The pool stage of the 1998–99 European Challenge Cup.

Pool stage

Pool 1

Pool 2

Pool 3

See also
European Challenge Cup
1998–99 Heineken Cup

References

pool stage
1998-99